Knowledge and Management of Aquatic Ecosystems is a peer-reviewed open access scientific journal covering management and conservation issues related to freshwater ecosystems. The journal publishes articles, short communications, reviews, comments and replies. It is published by EDP Sciences and the editor-in-chief is Thierry Oberdorff (IRD). The journal was established in 1928 as Bulletin Français de la Pêche et de la Pisciculture and obtained its current title in 2008.

An editorial published in 2002 by the outgoing editor Erick Vigneux, celebrates the 75 year anniversary of the journal. In this celebratory editorial it is explained that 'Knowledge and management of aquatic ecosystems' was introduced as a subtitle for the journal name in 1996.

Abstracting and indexing
The journal is abstracted and indexed in:

According to the Journal Citation Reports, the journal has a 2021 impact factor of 1.928.

New species first described in this journal
Occasionally new species have been first described in this journal. For example:

 The freshwater goby Stiphodon julieni was first described from specimens collected on Rapa in French Polynesia, in this journal in 2002.
 The freshwater goby Lentipes kaaea was first described in this journal in 2002.
 The characiform fish Tometes lebaili was first described in this journal in 2002.
 The freshwater prawn Macrobrachium feunteuni was first described in this journal in 2002.

References

External links
 

EDP Sciences academic journals
English-language journals
Open access journals
Publications established in 1928